The 1998 Saskatchewan Scott Tournament of Hearts women's provincial curling championship, was held January 21–25 at the Rosetown Sports Centre in Rosetown, Saskatchewan. The winning team of Cathy Trowell, represented Saskatchewan at the 1998 Scott Tournament of Hearts in Regina, Saskatchewan, where the team finished round robin with a 6-5 record, missing the playoffs after losing a tiebreaker to British Columbia's Sue Garvey.

Teams

Standings

Results

Draw 1
January 21, 7:00 PM CT

Draw 2
January 22, 10:00 AM CT

Draw 3
January 22, 2:30 PM CT

Draw 4
January 23, 10:00 AM CT

Draw 5
January 23, 2:00 PM CT

Draw 6
January 27, 7:00 PM CT

Draw 7
January 24, 10:00 AM CT

TieBreaker
January 24, 7:00 PM CT

Playoffs

Semifinal
January 29, 1:00 PM CT

Final
January 29, 5:00 PM CT

References

Saskatchewan Scott Tournament Of Hearts, 1998
1998 in Canadian curling
Scotties Tournament of Hearts provincial tournaments
Curling in Saskatchewan